The National Sports Exchange (NSE)  was a fantasy sports stock-trading marketplace.

Participants would create portfolios of pro athlete shares in the form of stocks, mutual funds, options & futures instruments, trading them in real time. Valuations were based on algorithms involving Sabermetric formulas, real time game statistics and supply/demand. The fundamentals of the marketplace proved sound, however the ecosystem of active participants proved small.

The company was co-founded in June 2002 by Michael Mangini, Jed Leslie, W. Taisto Bowers and Kaya Keys. The company raised angel funding and operated out of the Rensselaer Polytechnic Institute (RPI) Business Incubator program, located in Troy, NY.

In January 2004, all of NSE's assets were acquired by ProTrade Sports Management, later Citizen Sports. In March 2010, Citizen Sports was acquired by Yahoo! in a transaction rumored to be $30,000,000.

References

American stock traders